Chambery is a new neighbourhood in the Castledowns area of north west Edmonton, Alberta, Canada.  It is bounded on the west by 112 Street.  The south boundary is half a block north of 173 A Avenue.  To the north is Edmonton's Rural North West.  It is named for the Château de Chambéry in France.  Its location makes it ideal for persons working at CFB Edmonton, located just to the north of the city.

According to the 2005 municipal census, there were fewer than 300 residences in the neighbourhood.  All residences were owner-occupied single-family dwellings.

Demographics 

Surrounding neighbourhoods

External links 
 Chambery Demographic Profile

References 

Neighbourhoods in Edmonton